Baumwall is an elevated metro station located at Baumwall embankment in Hamburg's inner-city. It was opened in 1912 and is served by Hamburg U-Bahn line U3. It was renamed Baumwall (Elbphilharmonie) on 2 December 2016.

Location 
Baumwall ("tree ridge") is the name of an embankment on the Hamburg Harbour front. The station is located at the exposed headland of Fleet Island, between Herrengrabenfleet, Alsterfleet and Binnenhafen. Administratively, Baumwall belongs to Neustadt; bridges across Alsterfleet and Binnenhafen connect it with the districts Altstadt and HafenCity respectively. Historically, Baumwall was site of a water barrier and part of the Hamburg Wallanlagen.

The station has significance for both commuters and visitors. It is nearest station for the Hanseatic Trade Center and other large office complexes like Gruner + Jahr. For visitors it offers access to the Elbe Philharmonic Hall and the Speicherstadt.

Service 
Baumwall is served by Hamburg U-Bahn line U3; departures are every 5 minutes.

Gallery

See also 
 List of Hamburg U-Bahn stations

References

External links 

 Hamburg Untergrundbahn

Hamburg U-Bahn stations in Hamburg
U3 (Hamburg U-Bahn) stations
Buildings and structures in Hamburg-Mitte
Railway stations in Germany opened in 1912